SOS box is the region in the promoter of various genes to which the LexA repressor binds to repress the transcription of SOS-induced  proteins. This occurs in the absence of DNA damage. In the presence of DNA damage the binding of LexA is inactivated by the RecA activator. SOS boxes differ in DNA sequences and binding affinity towards LexA from organism to organism. Furthermore, SOS boxes may be present in a dual fashion, which indicates that more than one SOS box can be within the same promoter.

Examples

See Nucleic acid nomenclature for an explanation of non-GATC nucleotide letters.

See also
 SOS response
 SOS gene
 LexA
 RecA

References

 
 

DNA repair